The Maendeleo horseshoe bat (Rhinolophus maendeleo) is a recently discovered species of bats in the family Rhinolophidae. It inhabits caves of the Coastal Lowland forests of Tanzania. Its closest relative is the Adam's horseshoe bat. It was described in 2000.

References

Mammals of Tanzania
Rhinolophidae
Mammals described in 2000
Taxonomy articles created by Polbot
Bats of Africa